State Route 115 (SR 115) is a  long north–south state highway in the western portion of the U.S. state of Ohio. The highway has its southern terminus at a T-intersection with SR 65 in the northernmost portion of the city of Lima.

Route description
SR 115 traverses the northern portion of Allen County and the western half of Putnam County.  No section of this state route is included within the National Highway System (NHS).  The NHS is a network of highways considered to be most important for the nation's economy, mobility and defense.

History
SR 115 made its debut in 1923.  When it was first designated, SR 115 utilized all of its current alignment, then proceeded to the northwest from its present northern terminus a short distance along the current SR 15, then known as SR 22, to the County Road 18 (CR 18) intersection.  It then followed CR 18 north into Henry County to CR B, where it turned east, and followed CR B a short distance.  At CR 17, SR 115 turned north, and followed the county road a short distance to the CR 16C intersection.  The state route then followed CR 16C northeast into Holgate, where it ran along Wilhelm Street up to the point where it came to an end at its junction with what is now SR 108, but at the time designated as SR 188.

SR 115 would take on its current shape in 1969 when all of the highway from its present northern terminus at SR 15 to SR 108 in Holgate was removed from the state highway system.  The concurrent portion with SR 15 became just SR 15, while jurisdiction of all other portions of the former SR 115 was turned over to Putnam and Henry Counties.

Major intersections

References

External links

115
Transportation in Allen County, Ohio
Transportation in Putnam County, Ohio